Kamianets-Podilskyi is a city on the Smotrych River in western Ukraine, to the north-east of Chernivtsi. Formerly the administrative center of the Khmelnytskyi Oblast, the city is now the administrative center of the Kamianets-Podilskyi district within the Khmelnytskyi province. It hosts the administration of Kamianets-Podilskyi urban hromada. Current population has been estimated as 

In 1919–1920, during the unfolding Soviet–Ukrainian War, the city officially served as the temporary capital of the Ukrainian People's Republic.

Name

The second part of its name relates to the historic region of Podilia, of which Kamianets-Podilskyi is considered to be the historic capital.

Geography
Kamianets-Podilskyi is located in the southern portion of the Khmelnytskyi Oblast, located in the western Ukrainian region of Podillia. The Smotrych River, a tributary of the Dniester, flows through the city. The total area of the city comprises .

History

Classical antiquity
Several historians consider that a city on this spot was founded by the ancient Dacians, who lived in what is now modern Romania, Moldova, and portions of Ukraine. Historians write that the founders named the settlement Petridava or Klepidava, which originate from the Greek word petra or Latin lapis 'stone' and Dacian dava 'city'.

Kievan Rus and the Tatars (11th c.–1241)
Modern Kamianets-Podilskyi was first mentioned in 1062 as a town of the Kyivan Rus' state. In 1241, it was destroyed by the Mongolian invaders.

Polish rule (1352–1672)
In 1352, it was annexed by the Polish King Casimir III. In 1378 it became seat of a Roman Catholic Diocese. In 1432 King Sigismund I the Old granted Kamieniec Podolski city rights. In 1434 it became the capital of the Podolian Voivodship and the seat of local civil and military administration. The ancient castle was reconstructed and substantially expanded by the Polish kings to defend Poland from the southwest against Ottoman and Tatar invasions, thus it was called the gateway to Poland.

During the free election period in Poland, Kamianets-Podilskyi, as one of the most influential cities of the state, enjoyed voting rights (alongside Warsaw, Kraków, Poznań, Gdańsk, Lviv, Vilnius, Lublin, Toruń and Elbląg).

Ottoman rule (1672–1699)
After the Treaty of Buchach of 1672, Kamianets-Podilskyi was briefly part of the Ottoman Empire and capital of Podolya eyalet. It was also sanjak of pasha (central sanjak) of this eyalet with nahiyas of Kropotova, Satanova, İskala, Kitayhorad, Kırıvçe, İjvan and Mıhaylov. To counter the Turkish threat to the Polish–Lithuanian Commonwealth, King Jan III Sobieski built a fortress nearby, Okopy Świętej Trójcy (now Okopy, Ternopil Oblast; meaning "the Entrenchments of the Holy Trinity"). In 1687, Poland attempted to regain control over Kamianets-Podilskyi and Podolia, when the fortress was unsuccessfully besieged by the Poles led by Prince James Louis Sobieski.

Polish–Lithuanian Commonwealth (1699–1793)
In 1699, the city was given back to Poland under King Augustus II the Strong according to the Treaty of Karlowitz. The fortress was continually enlarged and was regarded as the strongest in the Polish–Lithuanian Commonwealth. The preserved ruins of the fortress still contain the iron cannonballs stuck in them from various sieges.

During this period, Bishop Dembowski, at the instigation of the Frankists, convened a public disputation at Kamieniec Podolski, in November 1757, and ordered all copies of the Talmud found in his bishopric to be confiscated and burned. Accounts of the Talmud burning differ—contemporary sources say that up to a thousand copies of the Talmud were destroyed, though other reports say only one copy was burned. Dembowski himself died days after the events, that a plague broke out, and that the local priests exhumed his body and cut the head off to prevent any further disaster.

Russian rule (1793–1915)
After the Second Partition of Poland in 1793, the city belonged to the Russian Empire, where it was the capital of the Podolia Governorate. The Russian Tsar Peter the Great, who visited the fortress twice, was impressed by its fortifications. One of the towers was used as a prison cell for Ustym Karmeliuk, a prominent peasant rebel leader of the early 19th century), who managed to escape from it three times. In 1798, Polish nobleman Antoni Żmijewski founded a Polish theater in the city. It was one of the oldest Polish theaters. In 1867 the Roman Catholic Diocese of Kamyanets-Podilskyi was abolished by the Russians authorities. It was re-established in 1918 by Pope Benedict XV.

According to the Russian census of 1897, Kamianets-Podilskyi remained the largest city of Podolia with a population of 35,934. In 1914, a direct railway line linked the city to Proskurov.

World War I and post-WWI tribulations
During World War I, the city was occupied by Austria-Hungary in 1915.

With the collapse of the Russian Empire in 1917, the city was briefly incorporated into several short-lived Ukrainian states: the Ukrainian People's Republic, the Hetmanate, and the Directoriya, before ending up as part of the Ukrainian SSR when Ukraine fell under Bolshevik power. During the Directorate period, the city was chosen as de facto capital of Ukraine after the Russian Communist forces occupied Kiev.

During the Polish-Soviet War, the city was captured by the Polish Army on the night of 16–17 November 1919 and was under Polish administration from 16 November 1919, to 12 July 1920.

In July 1920 battles between units of the Army of the Ukrainian People's Republic (UPR) and the Red Army took place in the village Veliki Zozulintsi and surrounding villages nearby Kamianets-Podilskyi. On 7 July 1920 soldiers of the 6th Reserve Rifle Brigade of the UPR Army were taken prisoner by the Bolsheviks. After refusing to join the Red Army, captured UPR soldiers were executed. In Veliki Zozulintsi a mass grave of 26 UPR soldiers are located.

Soviet times (1921-1991)

The area including Kamianets-Podilskyi was ceded to Soviet Russia in the 1921 Treaty of Riga, which determined its future for the next seven decades as part of the Ukrainian SSR.

Poles and Ukrainians have always dominated the city's population. However, as a commercial center, Kamianets-Podilskyi has been a multiethnic and multi-religious city with substantial Jewish and Armenian minorities. Under Soviet rule it became subject to severe persecutions, and many Poles were forcibly deported to Central Asia. Massacres such as the Vinnytsia massacre have taken place throughout Podillya, the last resort of independent Ukraine. Early on, Kamianets-Podilskyi was the administrative center of the Ukrainian SSR's Kamianets-Podilskyi Oblast, but the administrative center was later moved to Proskuriv (now Khmelnytskyi).

In December 1927, TIME Magazine reported that there were massive uprisings of peasants and factory workers in southern Ukraine, around the cities of Mohyliv-Podilskyi, Kamianets-Podilskyi, Tiraspol and others, against Soviet authorities. The magazine was intrigued when it found numerous reports from the neighboring Romania that troops from Moscow were sent to the region and suppressed the unrest, causing no less than 4,000 deaths. The magazine sent several of its reporters to confirm those occurrences which were completely denied by the official press naming them as barefaced lies. The revolt was caused by the collectivization campaign and the lawless environment in the cities caused by the Soviet government.

Following the Soviet invasion of Poland, the administrative center of the oblast was moved from the city of Kamianets-Podilskyi to the city of Khmelnytskyi. Kamianets-Podilskyi was occupied by the German troops on 11 July 1941 in the course of Operation Barbarossa. German, Ukrainian, and Hungarian police massacred 23,000 Jews 27–28 August 1941. On 26 March 1944 the town was freed from German occupation by the Red Army in the battle of the Kamenets-Podolsky pocket. Kamianets remained in Soviet Ukraine until the Dissolution of the Soviet Union.

Post-Soviet times
On 16 July 1990, the new Ukrainian parliament adopted a declaration of sovereignty.

On 16 January 1991, Pope John Paul II re-established the Roman Catholic Diocese of Kamyanets-Podilskyi, which was dissolved under Soviet rule.

, Kamianets-Podilskyi was the third-largest city of Podolia after Vinnytsia and Khmelnytskyi.

Until 18 July 2020, Kamianets-Podilskyi was incorporated as a city of oblast significance and served as the administrative center of Kamianets-Podilskyi Raion though it did not belong to the raion. In July 2020, as part of the administrative reform of Ukraine, which reduced the number of raions of Khmelnytskyi Oblast to three, the city of Kamianets-Podilskyi was merged into Kamianets-Podilskyi Raion.

Jewish history

During the Khmelnytsky Uprising (1648–58), the Jewish community of Kamianets-Podilskyi suffered much from Khmelnytsky's Cossacks on the one hand, and from the attacks of the Crimean Tatars (their main object being the extortion of ransoms) on the other.

About the middle of the 18th century, Kamianets-Podilskyi became celebrated as the center of the furious conflict then raging between the Talmudic Jews and the Frankists. The city was the residence of Bishop Dembowski, who sided with the Frankists and ordered the public burning of the Talmud, a sentence which was carried into effect in the public streets in 1757.

Kamianets-Podilskyi was also the residence of the wealthy Joseph Yozel Günzburg. During the latter half of the 19th century, many Jews from Kamianets-Podilskyi emigrated to the United States, especially to New York City, where they organized a number of societies.

One of the first and largest Holocaust massacres carried out in the opening stages of war between Nazi Germany and the Soviet Union, took place in Kamianets-Podilskyi on 27–28 August 1941. The killings were conducted by the Police Battalion 320 of the Order Police along with Friedrich Jeckeln's Einsatzgruppen, the Hungarian soldiers, and the Ukrainian Auxiliary Police. According to Nazi German reports, in two days a total of 23,600 Jews from the Kamianets-Podilskyi Ghetto were murdered, including 16,000 expellees from Hungary. As the historians of the Holocaust point out, the massacre constituted a prelude to the Final Solution conceived by the Nazis at Wannsee several months later. Eyewitnesses reported that the perpetrators made no effort to hide their deeds from the local population.

Climate

Culture

Main sights
The different peoples and cultures that have lived in the city have each brought their own culture and architecture. Examples include the Polish, Ruthenian and Armenian markets. Famous tourist attractions include the ancient castle, and the numerous architectural attractions in the city's center, including the cathedral of Saints Peter and Paul, Holy Trinity Church, the city hall building, and the numerous fortifications.

Ballooning activities in the canyon of the Smotrych River have also brought tourists. In May and October, the city hosts Ballooning festivals. In addition, everyone can book a balloon flight even not during the time of the festival.

Since the late 1990s, the city has grown into one of the chief tourist centers of western Ukraine. Annual Cossack Games (Kozatski zabavy) and festivals, which include the open ballooning championship of Ukraine, car racing and various music, art and drama activities, attract an estimated 140,000 tourists and stimulate the local economy. More than a dozen privately owned hotels have recently opened, a large number for a provincial Ukrainian city.

"Respublica" Festival is a music and art festival for youth featuring modern music, literature, and street art. This festival is held annually, gathering hundreds of young art lovers, musicians, and art enthusiasts. Many of the city's buildings are decorated with murals, created during these festivals. The murals depict historical events, as well as modern concepts.

International relations

Twin towns – Sister cities
Kamianets-Podilskyi is twinned with:
 Dolný Kubín, Slovakia
 Kalisz, Poland
 Zalau, Romania
 Brantford, Canada

Notable residents

Mikhail Alperin (born 1956), Ukrainian jazz pianist
Andrei Bondarenko (born 1987), Ukrainian operatic baritone, born here
 Nikolai Chebotaryov (1894–1947), Russian and Soviet mathematician, best known for the Chebotaryov density theorem.
 Moisey Gamarnik (born 1936), Soviet and Ukrainian physicist and inventor, born here
 Sergey Gorshkov (1910-1988), Russian and Soviet Admiral of the fleet of the Soviet Union, born here
 David Günzburg (Baron de Günzburg; 1857–1910) Russian orientalist and Jewish communal leader, born here
 Israel J. Hochman (1872–1940), American klezmer violinist and recording artist, born here
Sergius Ingerman (1868–1943), American physician and socialist, born here
 Józef Kallenbach (1861–1929), Polish historian of literature, born here 
 Yuriy Khimich (1928–2003), a Ukrainian painter, born here 
 Andrii Klantsa (born 1980), cardiac surgeon, scientist, Merited Doctor of Ukraine, Doctor of Science in Public Administration.
 Stanisław Koniecpolski (1590 or 1594–1646), Polish military commander, fought here
 Mark Kopytman (1929–2011), Soviet-Israeli composer, musicologist, and pedagogue, born here
 Murray Korman (1902–1961), American publicity photographer
 Leib Kvitko (1890–1952), Yiddish poet, author of children's poems, and member of the Jewish Anti-Fascist Committee
 Mykola Leontovych (1877–1921), Ukrainian composer, studied and graduated from the city's Theological Seminary
 Iryna Merleni (born 1982), female wrestler
 Aleksander Michałowski (1851–1938), Polish pianist, born here
 Mieczysław Mickiewicz (1879–before 1939), Polish politician, born here
 Szymon Okolski (1580–1653), Polish historian, lived here
 Ferdynand Antoni Ossendowski (1876—1945), Polish writer, explorer, professor, anti-communist and political activist; lived here.
 José Antonio Saravia (1785–1871), Spanish-born Russian general during the Napoleonic Wars; married and lived here.
 Joseph Saunders (engraver) (1773-1854), English printmaker, lived and died here
 Morris Schappes (1907–2004), American educator, writer, radical political activist, historian, and magazine editor
 Zvee Scooler (1899–1985), actor and radio commentator, best known as the Rabbi in Fiddler on the Roof; born here.
 Mendele Mocher Sforim (1836–1917), Jewish author; lived here
 Leo Sirota (1885-1965), Jewish pianist 
 Samuel Spielberg, Steven Spielberg's paternal grandfather 
 Mihail Starenki (1879–?), Bessarabian politician born here
 Leonid Stein (1934–1973), Soviet chess Grandmaster, born here
 Moshe Stekelis (1898–1967), Russian-Israeli archaeologist 
 Arthur Tracy (1899–1997), American singer, born here
 Anton Vasyutinsky (1858–1935), painter, coin and medal designer, born here
 Mikhail Veller (born 1948), Russian-Estonian writer, born here
 Ion Vinokur (1930–2006), Ukrainian archaeologist, historian, lived and worked here
 Jan de Witte (1709–1785), Polish architect and commander of the local fortress
 Jerzy Wołodyjowski, Polish colonel, prototype for one of Henryk Sienkiewicz's characters, Michał Wołodyjowski; killed here.
 Józef Zajączek (1752–1826), Polish general, born here
 Maurice Zbriger (1896–1981), Canadian violinist, composer, and conductor, born here
 Isidor Zuckermann (1866–1946), Austrian businessman

Gallery

See also 
 Kamianets-Podilskyi Castle
 Kamianets-Podilskyi massacre
 Kamenets-Podolsky pocket

References 
Notes

Bibliography

External links 

 "The old fortress on the Smotrich River," in Dzerkalo Tyzhnia (Mirror Weekly), 28 June – 5 July 2002, available online

 History of Jewish Community in Kamenets-Podolski
 The murder of the Jews of Kamianets-Podilskyi during World War II, at Yad Vashem website.
 The Lost Jewish Community of Kamenets-Podolsk
 Execution of Jews in Kamyanets-Podilskyi

 
Cities in Khmelnytskyi Oblast
Cities of regional significance in Ukraine
Podolia Voivodeship
Kamenets-Podolsky Uyezd
Shtetls
Holocaust locations in Ukraine
Kamianets-Podilskyi Raion
Rus' settlements